Sataporn Panichraksapong (also known as Tha, born 27 December 1967) is a Thai business executive in Thai entertainment conglomerate GMM Grammy. He is currently serving as the managing director of GMMTV.

Education
Sataporn graduated with a bachelor's degree in journalism and mass communications (cinematography) from Thammasat University. In 2014, he completed the Director Certification Program (DCP) from the Thai Institute of Directors Association.

Career
In January 2007, Sataporn, who was serving as deputy managing director of GMMTV, became its new managing director after Saithip Montrikul na Ayudhaya left the company to manage GMM Media Public Co., Ltd.

He became the chief executive officer of GMM 25 on 16 September 2018 replacing Saithip Montrikul na Ayudhaya.

References

External links
 
 

1967 births
Living people
Sataporn Panichraksapong
Sataporn Panichraksapong